Maraimalai Nagar - Kamarajar railway station is one of the railway stations of the – section of the Chennai Suburban Railway. It serves the neighbourhood of Maraimalai Nagar, a suburb of Chennai. It is situated at a distance of 47 km from Chennai Beach junction and is located on NH 45 in Maraimalai Nagar, with an elevation of 55 m above sea level. Government of India renamed the station after the INC(O) founder and the former Chief Minister of Tamil Nadu K. Kamaraj.

History
The lines at the station were electrified on 9 January 1965, with the electrification of the –Chengalpattu section.

See also

 Chennai Suburban Railway

References

External links
 Maraimalai Nagar railway station at IndiaRailInfo.com

 

Stations of Chennai Suburban Railway
Railway stations in Kanchipuram district